Scaeosopha atrinervis is a species of moth of the family Cosmopterigidae. It is found in Vietnam.

References

Moths described in 1931
Scaeosophinae